O-Ha! Ako Pa? is a 1994 Filipino comedy film directed by Mike Relon Makiling and starring Jimmy Santos.

Plot
The film's story is about the tenants of an exclusive village and the security guard hired to protect them. Ryan (Jimmy Santos) is a stupid but honest security guard while Nonong (Ogie Alcasid) is a clever country boy who comes to the big city to live with his cousin Steven (Patrick Guzman). When a problem led by a con artist named General Motorola (Paquito Diaz) arose, things will never be the same again for Ryan and the community but romance fills the air and love conquers all.

Cast
Jimmy Santos as Ryan
Ogie Alcasid as Nonong
Sunshine Cruz as Yvette	
Patrick Guzman as Steven
Babalu as Raul Malino/Chief Babalu
Michael V. as Jack
Jenette Fernando as Ligaya
Ruby Rodriguez as Elsa
Lailani Navarro as Gigi
Paolo Contis as Bad Teddy
Paquito Diaz as General Motorola/ head of Akyat Bahay
Jaime Fabregas as Yvette's father
Danny Labra as Typhoon Emong/ Akyat Bahay accomplice
Chinkee Tan as General Motorola's driver/ Akyat Bahay accomplice
Cita Astals as Principal
Nanding Fernandez as Bad Teddy's father
Ernie Zarate as Dracula/ first Akyat Bahay victim
Archie Adamos as Lucas
Dang Cruz as Brooks

References

External links

1994 films
Philippine comedy films
Filipino-language films
1990s Tagalog-language films
Films directed by Mike Relon Makiling